Eulepidotis candida is a moth of the family Erebidae first described by Constant Bar in 1876. It is found in the Neotropical realm, including French Guiana.

References

Moths described in 1876
candida